The Caldwell-Johnson-Morris Cottage is located in Anderson, South Carolina. It was constructed around 1851, and is historically significant because it illustrates the “raised cottage” genre of architecture, a style that became popular in the 19th century.

Specific features of this style include a raised brick basement and high wooden steps, both of which contribute to a two-story illusion. This landmark may easily be viewed from the public street. It was listed in the National Register on October 7, 1971.

References

Houses on the National Register of Historic Places in South Carolina
Houses completed in 1851
Houses in Anderson County, South Carolina
National Register of Historic Places in Anderson County, South Carolina
1851 establishments in South Carolina